= Fiel Domingos Constantino =

Angolan politician

Fiel Domingos Constantino is an Angolan accountant and former minister of commerce.

== Career ==
Constantino joined the civil service in 1995 as an accountant in the ministry of Finance. He became a member of the Order of Accountants and Experts of Angola in 2015. He previously served as Pedagogical Director of the Medium Institute of Economics of Luanda (Karl Marx Institute). He served as minister of commerce from March 2016 to September 2017.
